The 2012–13 FC Bayern Munich season was the 114th season in the club's history and the 48th consecutive season in the top flight of German football, the Bundesliga, since the promotion of the team from the Regionalliga Süd in 1965. Before the start of the season, Bayern signed Xherdan Shaqiri, Dante, Claudio Pizarro, Mitchell Weiser, Tom Starke and Mario Mandžukić. Bayern also added holding midfielder Javi Martínez after the first week of the Bundesliga season at the transfer deadline.

The club started the season with a nine-match winning streak.  The club would end the season claiming the Treble, winning the Bundesliga, the UEFA Champions League and the DFB-Pokal. Bayern became the first German club to achieve the Treble and the third European Club to complete the Treble in the last five seasons and seventh ever in European Club competition.

Review and events

Summer transfer window and pre-season
Xherdan Shaqiri, Claudio Pizarro, Tom Starke, Dante, Mario Mandžukić, Mitchell Weiser, Lukas Raeder, and Javi Martínez transferred to Bayern Munich in the summer transfer. The transfer of Javi Martínez, at €40 million, was at the time the most expensive transfer in the history of the Bundesliga. Takashi Usami, Breno, Rouven Sattelmaier, Ivica Olić, and Danijel Pranjić left Bayern, Hans-Jörg Butt retired, and Nils Petersen was loaned to Werder Bremen. Hans-Jörg Butt was appointed head of the Bayern Munich Junior Team on 1 July; but Hans-Jörg Butt left the position on 7 August. Wolfgang Dremmler was appointed his successor on 9 August. On 2 July, the club announced that Matthias Sammer replaced Christian Nerlinger during UEFA Euro 2012. Jupp Heynckes believed that the 2012–13 squad is better than the previous season's squad.

Bayern began pre-season training on 3 July. Bayern Munich CEO Karl-Heinz Rummenigge stated that the Bundesliga championship is the top priority for the club this season. During pre-season, Bayern defeated SpVgg Unterhaching, FC Ismaning, Trentino XI, and 1. FC Kaiserslautern. Bayern lost to Napoli during pre-season. Bayern participated in cup matches during pre-season. Bayern won the Yingli Cup, Audi Football Summit, and the Paulaner Cup des Südens. Bayern finished in third place in the LIGA total! Cup.

August
Pre-season continued into August Bayern. August started with a pre-season victory against 1. FC Kaiserslautern. Then in the LIGA total! Cup, Bayern lost in the semi-finals to Werder Bremen in a shoot-out on 4 August and won the third place match against Hamburger SV on 5 August. Bayern first competitive match was the DFL-Supercup on 12 August against Borussia Dortmund. Bayern won 2–1 with goals from Mario Mandžukić and Thomas Müller. Robert Lewandowski scored for Borussia Dortmund. The DFL-Supercup was Bayern's first trophy of the season. Bayern went on to defeat SV Seligenporten 3–1 in a friendly match on 15 August. Bayern then played in the first round of the DFB-Pokal against Jahn Regensburg on 20 August. Bayern won 4–0. Bayern got two goals from Mandžukić, a goal from Xherdan Shaqiri and a goal from Claudio Pizarro. Bayern finished August with their opening match of the Bundesliga campaign on 25 August against Greuther Fürth. Bayern won 3–0. Bayern got goals from Thomas Müller and Mandžukić. Thomas Kleine scored an own goal to put Bayern up 3–0. Bayern finished the matchday in first place in the league table. On 29 August, Karl Hopfner, Deputy Chairman of the Executive Board for Bayern Munich AG, announced he will leave the club on 31 December 2012 due to health reasons. Karl Hopfner applied for managing director of the club in October 1982 after seeing a job ad for the position in the Süddeutsche Zeitung. Hopfner had an interview in January 1983 and started as managing director in July 1983. The draw for the Group Stage of Champions League took place on 30 August. Bayern were drawn against Valencia, Lille, and BATE Borisov.

September
Bayern started the month with a match against VfB Stuttgart on 2 September. Bayern won 6–1 through two goals from Thomas Müller and one each from Toni Kroos, Luiz Gustavo, Mario Mandžukić and Bastian Schweinsteiger. Martin Harnik scored for Stuttgart. Bayern finished matchday 2 in first place. Bayern then faced Mainz 05 on 15 September, winning 3–1 through goals by Mandžukić, Schweinsteiger and Kroos. Ádám Szalai scored for Mainz. Bayern went on to face Valencia in Champions League on 19 September. Bayern won 2–1, where Schweinsteiger and Kroos scored for Bayern. Bayern faced Schalke 04 on 22 September. Bayern won 2–0 with goals from Kroos and Müller. Bayern faced VfL Wolfsburg on 25 September. Bayern won 3–0 with one goal from Schweinsteiger and two from Mandžukić. Bayern finished September with a league match against Werder Bremen on 29 September, where the club prevailed 2–0 via Luiz Gustavo and Mandžukić goals.

October
Bayern faced BATE Borisov on 2 October. The loss ended Bayern's nine-match winning streak.

Bayern faced 1899 Hoffenheim on 6 October.

Bayern faced Fortuna Düsseldorf on 20 October.

Bayern faced LOSC Lille on 23 October.

Bayern faced Bayer Leverkusen on 28 October.

Bayern faced 1. FC Kaiserslautern on 31 October.

November

Bayern faced Hamburger SV on 3 November.

Bayern faced LOSC Lille on 7 November.

Bayern faced Eintracht Frankfurt on 10 November.

Bayern faced 1. FC Nürnberg on 17 November.

Bayern faced Valencia 20 November.

Bayern faced Hannover 96 on 24 November.

Bayern faced SC Freiburg on 28 November.

December
Bayern faced Borussia Dortmund on 1 December.

Bayern faced BATE Borisov on 5 December.

Bayern faced FC Augsburg on 8 December.

Bayern faced Borussia Mönchengladbach on 14 December.

Bayern faced FC Augsburg on 18 December.

The draw for the Champions League Round of 16 took place on 20 December. The result was that Bayern would face Arsenal.

January
Bayern started January with mid-winter training on 3 January. Bayern had training in Qatar. Bayern defeated Lekhwiya SC, Schalke 04, FC Basel, and SpVgg Unterhaching during the mid-winter break. On 16 January, Pep Guardiola was announced as the new head coach for Bayern Munich. Guardiola is set to over for the incumbent Jupp Heynckes on 26 June, the start of pre-season training for the 2013–14 season. Bayern started the second half of the Bundesliga campaign on 19 January against Greuther Fürth. Bayern won 2–0 with two goals from Mario Mandžukić. The next day, Bayern defeated Alemannia Aachen in a friendly match. Bayern finished off January with a league match against VfB Stuttgart on 27 January. Bayern won 2–0 with goals from Mario Mandžukić and Thomas Müller.

February
Bayern started February with a league match against Mainz 05 on 2 February. Bayern won 3–0 through one goal from Mandžukić and two from Müller. Thomas Müller scored two goals. Bayern went on to face Schalke 04 on 9 February. Bayern won 4–0 with goals from David Alaba, Bastian Schweinsteiger and Mario Gómez. David Alaba scored two goals. Then Bayern faced VfL Wolfsburg. Bayern won 2–0. Mandžukić and Arjen Robben got the goals for Bayern. Bayern then had the first leg in the Round of 16 of Champions League on 19 February against Arsenal. Bayern won 3–1. Bayern's goalscorers were Toni Kroos, Müller and Mandžukić. Arsenal's goalscorer was Lukas Podolski. Bayern were back in league action against Werder Bremen on 23 February. Bayern won 6–1. Bayern got goals from Robben, Javi Martínez, Mario Gómez and Franck Ribéry. Mario Gómez scored two goals. Theodor Gebre Selassie scored an own goal that put Bayern up 3–0. Kevin De Bruyne scored for Werder Bremen. Bayern finished February with a quarter-final match in the DFB-Pokal on 27 February against Borussia Dortmund. Bayern won 1–0 with a goal from Robben.

March
Bayern started March with a league match against 1899 Hoffenheim on 3 March. Bayern won 1–0 with a goal from Mario Gómez. Bayern set a new league record with 583 consecutive minutes without conceding a goal. Bayern Munich faced Fortuna Düsseldorf on 9 March, winning 3–2 through Thomas Müller, Franck Ribéry and Jérôme Boateng goals. Mathis Bolly and Andreas Lambertz scored for Fortuna Düsseldorf. Bayern had the second leg of the Round of 16 in Champions League on 13 March against Arsenal. Arsenal won 2–0 with goals from Olivier Giroud and Laurent Koscielny. Bayern, however, advanced on the away goals rule. The quarter-final draw for Champions League took place on 15 March. Bayern were drawn against Juventus. Bayern faced Bayer Leverkusen on 16 March, winning 2–1. Mario Gómez scored for Bayern, Simon Rolfes equalized for Bayer Leverkusen, then Philipp Wollscheid scored an own goal to win the match for Bayern. Bayern finished March with a league match against Hamburger SV on 30 March. Bayern won 9–2. Xherdan Shaqiri, Bastian Schweinsteiger, Claudio Pizzaro, Arjen Robben and Franck Ribéry scored for Bayern. Claudio Pizzaro scored four goals and Arjen Robben scored two goals. Jeffrey Bruma and Heiko Westermann scored for Hamburg.

April
Bayern started April against Juventus in the first leg of the Champions League quarter-finals on 4 April. Bayern won 2–0 with goals from David Alaba and Thomas Müller. David Alaba's goal inside the first minute of the match. Toni Kroos tore his abductor muscle and was replaced by Arjen Robben in the 16th minute. Bayern went on to face Eintracht Frankfurt on matchday 28 on 6 April. Bayern won the match 1–0. The win meant Bayern won the Bundesliga in record time. Luiz Gustavo picked up his fifth yellow card and is suspended for matchday 29 against 1. FC Nürnberg. The return leg against Juventus was played on 10 April. Bayern again defeated Juventus 2–0; Mario Mandžukić and Claudio Pizzaro scored the goals. With Bayern's victory, the 2012–13 Champions League season is the first time that two German clubs are in the semi-finals. Mandžukić controversially picked up a yellow card early in the match and is suspended for the first leg of the semi-finals. The draw for the semi-finals of the Champions League was held on 12 April. Bayern were drawn against Barcelona. Bayern faced 1. FC Nürnberg on 13 April. Emre Can started for Bayern, making his Bundesliga debut. Xherdan Shaqiri was replaced by Pierre-Emile Højbjerg in the 71st minute. Højbjerg made his Bundesliga debut. At the age of 17 years and 251 days, Højbjerg became the youngest Bundesliga player in Bayern's history, breaking David Alaba's record of 17 years and 255 days. Bayern won 4–0 with goals from Jérôme Boateng, Mario Gómez, Rafinha and Xherdan Shaqiri. Bayern faced VfL Wolfsburg on 16 April in the DFB-Pokal. Bayern won 6–1. Bayern got goals from Mandžukić, Robben, Shaqiri and Gómez. Mario Gómez scored three goals within nine-minute of coming on. Diego scored for Wolfsburg. Bayern faced Hannover 96 on 20 April. Bayern won 6–1. Bayern got goals from Ribéry, Gómez and Pizzaro; Gómez and Pizzaro scored two goals each. With the victory, Bayern equaled Borussia Dortmund's record of 81 points in a season and broke the record for most wins in a season with 26. On 23 April, Bayern announced the signing of announced the signing of Mario Götze. Bayern activated the €37 million release clause that Götze and Borussia Dortmund agreed to. Bayern faced Barcelona in the first leg of the Champions League semi-final on 23 April. Bayern won 4–0 with goals from Müller, Gómez and Robben. Müller scored two goals. The media criticized Hungarian referee Viktor Kassai for not calling a penalty shot against Gerard Piqué in the 15th minute, Alexis Sánchez in the 32nd minute, and allowing Mario Gómez's goal to stand when he was in an offside position. Bayern finished April with a match against SC Freiburg on 27 April. Bayern won 1–0 with a goal from Xherdan Shaqiri. With the win, Bayern had 84 points in the Bundesliga, a new record.

May/June
Bayern started May with the second leg against Barcelona on 1 May. Barcelona players Sergio Busquets, Javier Mascherano, Carles Puyol and Eric Abidal were all out due to injury. Mario Mandžukić returned from suspension and replaced Mario Gómez, while Daniel Van Buyten replaced Dante, who was suffering from a cold. Lionel Messi did not play in the match. Bayern won 3–0, with goals from Arjen Robben and Thomas Müller, and an own goal from Gerard Piqué. Philipp Lahm, Bastian Schweinsteiger, Javi Martínez, Luiz Gustavo, Dante and Mario Gómez were all one yellow card away from being suspended for the 2013 UEFA Champions League Final. However, none of them received a yellow card and are all available for selection in the final. Bayern went on to face Borussia Dortmund on 4 May in the Bundesliga. The match ended in a 1–1 draw. Kevin Großkreutz scored for Dortmund, while Mario Gómez scored for Bayern. Rafinha was sent off after receiving a second yellow card. Rafinha was eventually suspended for the remaining two Bundesliga matches. On 6 May, the FC Bayern München AG supervisory board had a regularly scheduled meeting where Uli Hoeneß, president of Bayern München e.V. and chairman of FC Bayern München AG, offered to step down on a temporary basis. The supervisory board decided to reject Uli Hoeneß's offer. Bayern Munich announced that executive board members Karl-Heinz Rummenigge and Andreas Jung have signed contract extensions. Rummenigge was given a three-year extension which is scheduled to expire on 30 December 2016 and Jung contract was extended by two years to 30 June 2016. In addition, Bayern also announced that Jörg Wacker will join the executive board on 1 July 2013. Bayern faced FC Augsburg on 11 May. Bayern won 3–0 with goals from Müller Shaqiri and Luiz Gustavo. Bayern finished their Bundesliga campaign against Borussia Mönchengladbach on 18 May. Bayern won 4–3. Martínez, Ribéry, and Robben scored for Bayern. Franck Ribéry scored two goals. Martin Stranzl, Mike Hanke and Håvard Nordtveit scored for Borussia Mönchengladbach. Bayern faced Borussia Dortmund in the Champions League final on 25 May. Bayern won 2–1. Mandžukić and Robben scored for Bayern, and İlkay Gündoğan scored for Dortmund. After the match, Bayern had a party at the Great Room in the Grosvenor House Hotel. The party included a buffet for 1,800 people. Brand Finance valued Bayern at $860 million (£570 million), overtaking Manchester United for top spot. Bayern faced VfB Stuttgart in the DFB-Pokal Final on 1 June. Bayern won 3–2. Thomas Müller and Mario Gómez scored for Bayern. Mario Gómez scored two goals. Martin Harnik scored twice for Stuttgart.

Bayern–Brazil dispute
The Brazilian Football Confederation (CBF) insisted that Dante and Luiz Gustavo report to the Brazil national team's training camp for 1 June at 16:00 local time. The training camp was for preparations for the 2013 FIFA Confederations Cup. Bayern, however, were due to play VfB Stuttgart in the 2013 DFB-Pokal Final on 1 June. The CBF threatened to exclude both players if they did not report by the stated time. Under FIFA rules, clubs must let players report to national teams 14 days prior to the start of a tournament. Bayern sent a "polite" letter asking for their release for the final, however the CBF responded with a "polite" letter rejecting it. Bayern attempted to reach an "amicable solution". with the Brazilian Football Confederation but failed. Bayern CEO Karl-Heinz Rummenigge blamed FIFA, the CBF and the German Football Association (DFB). The German Football Association blamed the Brazilian Football Confederation. Brazil head coach Luiz Felipe Scolari claimed that Bayern were at fault since the CBF claimed that they sent letters 5, 10 and 15 days before the release date and also stated how they "would have been willing to negotiate" with the 15-day notice. Notably, the Royal Spanish Football Federation did not enforce the rule for Javi Martínez and made the player available for the DFB-Pokal final.

Broken records

Bayern broke or equaled 30 records during the season.

Match results

Friendly matches

Friendly matches

1.Times in Central European Time/Central European Summer Time
2.Bayern goals listed first.

Pre-season cup matches

1.Times in Central European Time/Central European Summer Time
2.Bayern goals listed first.

Bundesliga

League table

Results summary

League results

DFB-Pokal

DFL-Supercup

UEFA Champions League

Group stage (Group F)

Group results

Last updated: 5 December 2012
Source: UEFA.com

Group standings

Results summary

Knockout phase

Round of 16

Quarter-finals

Semi-finals

Final

Team statistics

Record

Record by competition

Squad information

Squad and statistics

Squad, appearances and goals

Minutes played

Discipline

Bookings

Suspensions

Transfers

In

Out

Awards
Philipp Lahm, Manuel Neuer and Mario Gómez were nominated for the FIFA Ballon d'Or. Jupp Heynckes was nominated for FIFA World Coach of the Year.

References

FC Bayern Munich seasons
Bayern Munich season 2012-13
Bayern Munich season 2012-13
UEFA Champions League-winning seasons
German football championship-winning seasons
14